Baron is a commune in the Oise department in northern France.

History

On September 3, 1914, in the early stages of World War I, the estate of Manoir de Fontaines at Baron was the scene of composer Albéric Magnard shooting at invading German soldiers, killing one of them, and then being killed when they set the house on fire. At the time the event focused considerable public attention on Baron, Magnard being considered a French national hero for his act.

Population

Notable people
Albéric Magnard

See also
Communes of the Oise department

References

External links

Communes of Oise